Olu Ajayi  (born 18 August 1963) is a Nigerian painter, cartoonist and art reviewer. He is a past president of the Society of Nigerian Artists, Lagos chapter and is a founding member of Guild of Professional Fine Artists. He is featured on the Who’s who in Nigeria online biography.

Early life 
Olu was born on 18 August 1963 and is a native of Ososo, in Akoko Edo LGA of Edo State. He graduated from the Auchi Polytechnic in 1984 with a HND in Fine Arts. Olu Ajayi illustrated Xanti by Neville Ukoli, and the Aboki Comic Strip of Defunct The Sunday Observer Newspapers. He was also the in-house cartoonist of Defunct The Nigerian Observer Newspapers.

Career 
Olu Ajayi is one of the early pioneers of water colour paintings in Nigeria. After becoming a member of the Society of Nigerian Artists (SNA), he rose to become the President of the Lagos Chapter between 2008 – 2014 and instituted the October Rain and Art Café events that marks SNA's yearly programmes. He was also the founding member of the Guild of Professional Fine Artists and his works had been commissioned work for several institutions including commercial banks, churches, galleries and blue-chip companies.
 
His works had been exhibited in Nigeria, Africa and Europe and served as a consultant across local and international art platforms. He has reviewed Funnso Ogunlade's "A Promise of Harvest”, Humphrey Bekaren's "A New Pride”, Abraham Ogbodo's "Painting a New Order", Chinwe Uwatse's "A Blaze of Colour", and "Eccentric Paintings" by the Sunday Times Newspapers, Lagos.

Style 
Olu Ajayi is inspired by the 1980s art scene, Adolph Frederick Reinhardt and Salvador Dalí. He prefers working on the female forms using bold colors representing pseudo human figures caught in candid positions.

Notable work 
Market by the Palace (1999) an oil on canvas painting was his highest grossing exhibited work sold at Arthouse Contemporary Limited in 2008.

References

External links 
Profile archive at Who's Who in Nigeria
Profile at ArtXLagos

1963 births
Auchi Polytechnic alumni
Nigerian painters
Nigerian cartoonists
Nigerian illustrators
People from Edo State
Edo people
Living people